Floriane André (born 30 May 2000) is a French female handballer for Neptunes de Nantes and the French national team.

She made her official debut on the French national team on 23 April 2022, against Ukraine in Le Havre. She also represented France at the 2022 European Women's Handball Championship in Slovenia, Montenegro and North Macedonia.

Honours

Club  
EHF European League:
Winner: 2021
Coupe de France:
Finalist: 2021

References

External links

2000 births
Living people
French female handball players
21st-century French women